Gen. David B. Birney School is a historic school building located in the Logan neighborhood of Philadelphia.  Originally built for the School District of Philadelphia, it was designed by Henry deCourcy Richards and built in 1912-1913. The building is now home to The Lindley Academy Charter School At Birney, a charter school within the School District of Philadelphia.

The building is a three-story, five bay, reinforced concrete building in the Tudor Revival-style.  It is faced in brick and features a limestone center entrance with entablature and decorative panels.  

The school was named for Civil War General David B. Birney (1825-1864), son of the noted abolitionist James G. Birney.

It was added to the National Register of Historic Places in 1988.

References

School buildings on the National Register of Historic Places in Philadelphia
Tudor Revival architecture in Pennsylvania
School buildings completed in 1913
Logan, Philadelphia
1913 establishments in Pennsylvania